St. Marys Bay (Miꞌkmaq: Wagweiik) south western Nova Scotia, Canada, is surrounded by the modern municipal districts of Clare Municipal District and Digby.

Saint Mary's Bay (Wagweiik) is situated within the Federal Fishing District 34, the most lucrative lobster fishing zone in Canada with the Bay accounting for 1,691 metric tonnes of commercially landed lobster in the 2016–2017 season and a record high value of $25.3 million. The bay is also well known for haddock, herring, mackerel, clams and scallops.

Pre European contact

The native Mi'kmaw have occupied and used Oostitukum (Digby Neck) and the mainland shore and the waters between since before the arrival of Europeans, and the bay is known by the Mi'kmaw as Wagweiik. The mouth of Salmon River is thought to be a traditional summer settlement of the Mi'kmaw and several artifacts have been found there, as well as at Meteghan, Major's Point and other sites. A site known as BcDM-01 by Erskine situated at Major's Point in Belliveau Cove is described: "Beside the road to the shore about .40km from the sea, a field is full of late Indian Garden Chips. On the shore, Rene Belliveau found a small cluster of shallow hearths, probably where Indians waited for the tides to turn. Chips were of the late Indian Gardens, and one was of Nwe Brunswick green quartzite.

Place names like Hectanooga, Mitihikan (Meteghan), and Chicaben (Church Point) are found in the area. They also had a principal settlement by River Allen near Cape Sainte-Marie used for fishing and as a canoe route. The Mi'kmaw also used a fishing weir system for catching mackerel and herring that they taught to the new settlers, which they continued to use until well into the 1900s, and fish drying techniques that continue today. They also caught eels, seals, clams, urchins and other sea life, as well as berries, medicinal plants and other coastal resources.

The earliest European records come from Samuel de Champlain and Pierre Dugua, Sieur de Mons from 1604, and include details of their first expedition. The sakmowk of Kespukwitk district, and Grand Chief of the other six indigenous districts at the time was Henri Membertou, who welcomed the French explorers and settlers, and who died at Saint Mary's Bay in 1611 at age 103.

Post European contact

The Baie Ste. Marie is commonly regarded as having been avoided by the Acadians until this area was granted to them by the British on their return a decade after their explusion. Apart from the French explorations of 1604 led by Pierre Dugua de Mons, who was accompanied by Samuel de Champlain, the are no discovered records of any trading posts or expeditions to Saint Mary's Bay by either French or British. As the new settlers arrived in the late 1760s–1780s, the Mi'kmaq passed on to the Acadians their techniques for hunting, fishing and food preservation.  It is asserted by one source that the Mi'kmaq were not interested in agriculture, and the slow pace of the settlers land clearing did not affect the Mi'kmaq's hunting or fishing grounds, or immediately drive away game. 

By the 1800s the Mi'kmaq had vacated the area to live on the Reservation developed in Bear River, while still returning for fishing, hunting, trade and ceremony throughout the year.  In one record many also returned during the 1800s to attend mass at Saint Mary's Church in Church Point, presided by Father Jean-Mandé Sigogne. In an 1816 letter, Father Sigogne wrote "Hordes of Mi'kmaq gather with their children, during certain seasons at my church, some from as far away as 300 miles" 

The 1871 Census in the sub-districts St. Mary’s Bay recorded the number of Mi'kmaq to be "none found", while the 1901 census recorded 8,655 people in Clare.

Geography
A sub-basin of the Gulf of Maine, the bay's southeastern shore is formed by mainland Nova Scotia, while its northwestern shore is formed by the Digby Neck, Long Island and Brier Island.

The bay bifurcates the two municipal districts in Digby County, with the bilingual Clare Municipal District located on the mainland portion (southeastern shore) and the Digby Neck being part of the Digby Municipal District, which also occupies the eastern half of the county.

These bodies of water have shaped life on Digby Neck in several ways. Their tides are among the highest in the world, spanning 50 feet (16 metres) in places. The rich and varied flora and fauna of the bays are a result of this tidal action. Regularly exposed swaths of wet ocean floor create a special environment for the species that inhabit these regions. Tidal action also causes a stirring up of the water, allowing whales to feed easily on agitated plankton. This is one reason why the Bay of Fundy is world-renowned for its whale watching trips.

Shipbuilding, once an economic force in the area, was facilitated by the tides. Dry docks allowed ships to be built and floated without moving them, a significant advantage given the size and weight of a large boat. Weir fishing also benefits from the tides.  At high tide the weir is submerged, fish swim in to the weir and, at low tide, the fishermen row in and scoop up the fish that are trapped at low tide.

Major communities situated on St. Marys Bay include Sandy Cove, Weymouth, Belliveaus Cove, Comeauville, Saulnierville, and Meteghan.

Public parks are located at Meteghan (Smugglers Cove Provincial Park), Cape St. Marys, (Cape Cove Beach/ Mavilette Beach Provincial Park). and Plympton (Savary Picnic Park).

Modern Indigenous fishery
The Peace and Friendship Treaty of 1752 signed in Shubencadie/Sipekne’katik district on November 22, 1752 in Halifax by Jean Baptiste Cope and representatives for His Majesty The King (Government of Canada) affirmed that the Sipekne’katik the right to have free liberty of Hunting and Fishing among numerous other rights.

In the fall of 2020, the Sipekne’katik First Nation began exercising its self-managed moderate livelihood fishery in St. Mary's Bay, resulting in Acadian fishermen targeting and intimidating buyers in an attempt to undermine the sale of band lobster caught through their court-affirmed treaty rights. Tensions have escalated with non-Indigenous fishermen, who take issue with the Mi’kmaq fishery operating outside of the regulated fishing season leading to an incident with a group of as many as 200 local commercial fishermen participating in a series of violent, racist raids which saw buildings besieged, property damaged, commodities destroyed.
Mi’kmaq leaders say they are allowed to catch fish under a 1999 Supreme Court decision that affirms their right to fish for a moderate livelihood. DFO and RCMP have also come under fire for standing by watching the situation deteriorate.

In the town of New Edinburgh hundreds of commercial fishermen arrived at an indigenous operated lobster pound to stage a protest that turned violent, and Federal ministers condemned the attacks, with Minister of Indigenous Services Mark Miller calling the violence “disgusting, unacceptable, and racist in nature.”

Sipekne’katik fishermen have been using Federal Wharves at Saulnierville in Clare and Weymouth (Wessagusset) in Digby. 

In 2020 there were approximately 900 commercial lobster licenses with about 400 traps per boat, compared to the Indigenous fishery which had less than 10 boats carrying 50 traps each. The Association of Nova Scotia University Teachers released a statement  in support and solidarity with the Mi’kmaq peoples, as they assert their recognized treaty right to fish, also calling on the Governments of Canada and Nova Scotia to ensure Mi’kmaq fishers are protected while they pursue their legal right to fish. Labour unions, including UFCW Canada, also called on the federal government to uphold treaty rights with Indigenous peoples and quickly address the threats and discrimination that the Mi’kmaq fishers are experiencing.

References

External links 
 Natural History of Nova Scotia (excerpt)

Landforms of Digby County, Nova Scotia
Bays of Nova Scotia